is a Buddhist temple located in the city of Sakura in Chiba Prefecture, Japan.  The temple was originally located in Yamagata Prefecture, but when the Hotta clan was granted control of the Sakura Domain, Hotta Masasuke moved the temple in 1746 to serve as the clan's ,  or family temple. The Hotta clan's historical grave marker is located at Jindai-ji, as are the tombstones of Hotta Masatoshi, Hotta Masayoshi, and Hotta Masatomo, all of which are designated as Chiba Prefectural Historical Places. The bronze statue of the Eleven-Faced Kannon, the primary object of veneration at Jindai-ji, is by the artist Tsuda Shinobu (1875-1946).

Sources

External links 
Chiba no Kankō Marugoto Shōkai 

Buddhist temples in Chiba Prefecture
Tendai temples